Pedro de Zubiaur, Zubiaurre or Çubiaurre (1540 – 3 August 1605) was a Spanish naval officer, general of the Spanish Navy, distinguished for his achievements in the Anglo-Spanish War (1585–1604).

Biography
Born into a seafaring family from Biscay, Zubiaur started his naval career in 1568 plying between the ports of Bilbao and Flanders, where he worked under the command of the Grand Duke of Alba. After getting promoted to General for his naval achievements in the Low Countries, during the Brittany campaign he won several battles against the English for Philip II of Spain, the most famous of them during the relief of Blaye. He captured six English ships from Raleigh's fleet near cape Finisterre in 1597.

After the war, in 1605, he was put in command of 18 ships charged with transporting troops to Dunkirk but on the way they met a Dutch fleet of 80 ships under admiral Hatwain. Zubiaur was severally wounded in the ensuing battle. After losing two ships and 400 men, he managed to find shelter at Dover, under the protection of the English artillery, now allied to Spain. His injuries, however, were so serious that he died there some days later. His body was transported to Bilbao for burial.

References
GRACIA RIVAS, Manuel: En el IV Centenario del fallecimiento de Pedro Zubiaur, un marino vasco del siglo XVI. Revista de Estudios Marítimos del País Vasco, 5, Untzi Museoa-Museo Naval, Donostia-San Sebastián, 2006, pp. 157-171 

Basque sailors
Spanish sailors
Spanish generals
Spanish military personnel killed in action
1540 births
1605 deaths
People of the Anglo-Spanish War (1585–1604)
People from Lea-Artibai